The Toronto School of Theology (TST) is an ecumenical consortium of seven theological colleges and is affiliated with the University of Toronto. TST is the largest ecumenical consortium for theological education in Canada. Its seven member schools are Emmanuel College, Knox College, Regis College, St. Augustine's Seminary, University of St. Michael's College Faculty of Theology, Trinity College Faculty of Divinity, and Wycliffe College.

Each of TST's member colleges are fully accredited by the Association of Theological Schools in the United States and Canada. Academic standards are consistent with those of the University of Toronto, which holds TST accountable through a highly developed process of quality assurance.

The TST consortium offers a full range of professional and academic degrees, for different educational purposes. Some are primarily professional in character, while others are oriented to general theological studies or research. All degree programs operate at the post-baccalaureate level, and degrees are conferred conjointly by the University of Toronto.

By bringing together established and junior scholars from a wide variety of Christian and non-Christian traditions, in the context of one of the world's preeminent research universities, TST offers students an exceptional opportunity to research and understand the Bible, Christian belief and discipleship, the history of Christianity and Church leadership, and to prepare for various forms of ministry in the contemporary world.

History
In 1944, the Toronto Graduate School of Theological Studies (TGSTS) was formed to promote collaboration in the Doctor of Theology and Master of Theology programs at Emmanuel, Knox, Trinity, and Wycliffe Colleges. In 1964, the TGSTS was incorporated and this year is considered the official year when the current Toronto School of Theology was established. In 1966, the Graduate Theological Division of St. Michael's College joined TGSTS.

During 1969-70, the success of this venture led to the foundation of the current Toronto School of Theology (TST). Regis College and St. Augustine's Seminary entered into the consortium as member schools, and collaboration began in two professional programs, the MDiv and the MRE, supplementing the cooperation that already existed in the ThD and ThM programs. TST was incorporated in April 1970, by an amendment to the Letters Patent of the TGSTS.

In 1978, TST and its member schools entered into a Memorandum of Agreement with the University of Toronto, making possible the conjoint granting of degrees in theology by the University and the member schools of TST. TST committed itself to the University's academic standards, and began appointing the University's representatives to its Board of Trustees, its academic councils, and its faculty appointments committees. Finally, in 1979 a Memorandum of Agreement with the University of Toronto made it possible for the member schools to grant conjoint basic and advanced degrees in theology.

The Toronto School of Theology's Arms and Flag were registered with the Canadian Heraldic Authority on March 1, 2001. The school's motto is the Greek word , which is taken from 2 Corinthians 6:1 and means "We work together with Him" (or more loosely translates to “Co-worker”).

Member Institutions
The Toronto School of Theology consists of seven member theological schools and is the largest ecumenical consortium for theological education in Canada.

Affiliated Institutions

Academics

Programs 
The seven member colleges of the Toronto School of Theology (TST) offer several basic (entry-level) master's degrees in theology, which provide students with an introduction to theological study as well as preparation for professional ministry. Basic degree programs are first theological degrees taught at the post-baccalaureate level.

TST member colleges also offer a variety of academically focused advanced master's and doctoral degrees in accordance with the regulations of the Academic Council. As well, TST offers a Doctor of Ministry program offering advanced studies in the practice of professional ministry.

A majority of TST’s degrees are awarded conjointly by a TST member college and the University of Toronto, while a few degrees, certificates and diplomas are solely awarded by a TST college.

Basic Degrees 
The following degrees are offered conjointly by the Toronto School of Theology (TST) member colleges and the University of Toronto. Not all TST Colleges offer all degrees. The degrees are listed below according to the categories of the Association for Theological Schools.

 Master of Divinity (MDiv) - leading to ministerial leadership
 Master of Religious Education (MRE) - to prepare for educational ministries
 Master of Theological Studies (MTS) - a general introduction to theological scholarship
 Theology, Spirituality and the Arts Stream
 Urban Community Development Stream

To prepare for specialized ministries:

 Master of Pastoral Studies (MPS)
 Social Service Stream
 Worship and Preaching Stream
 Spiritual Care Stream - Certificate in Spiritual Care and Psychotherapy
 Master of Arts in Ministry and Spirituality (MAMS)
 Master of Sacred Music (MSMus)

The following certificates are offered conjointly by TST member colleges and the University of Toronto. Not all TST colleges offer all certificates.

 Certificate in Theological Studies (CTS)
 Certificate in Theology and Interreligious Engagement (CTIE)

Graduate Degrees 
The Toronto School of Theology (TST) has the largest graduate program in theology in Canada, with nearly 400 students registered in TST's graduate degree programs. TST offers two advanced master's degrees, the Master of Theology (ThM) and the Master of Arts in Theology (MA). Both degrees are granted conjointly by the University of Toronto and the TST member school in which the student is registered. TST's doctoral program leads towards the Doctor of Philosophy in Theological Studies (PhD), granted conjointly by the University of Toronto and the TST member school in which the student is registered. The Doctor of Ministry (DMin) program is a professional doctoral degree granted conjointly by the University of Toronto and the TST member school in which the student is registered.

The following graduate degrees are awarded conjointly by a TST member college and the University of Toronto:

 Doctor of Philosophy (PhD) in Theological Studies
 Master of Arts (MA) in Theological Studies
 Master of Theology (ThM)
 Doctor of Ministry (DMin)

Reputation and Rankings

In the 2021 QS World University Rankings, the Toronto School of Theology/University of Toronto was ranked #1 in Canada and #11 in the world for Theology, Divinity & Religious Studies. The journal First Things, an organ of the Institute on Religion and Public Life in New York, ranked the Toronto School of Theology fourth among graduate programs in theology. The Toronto School of Theology was also ranked #3 for the number of doctoral students that have graduated and gone on to positions in fellow member schools of the Association of Theological Schools.

Toronto School of Theology libraries

Students have access to the libraries of every member school, including Knox's Caven Library, St. Michael's Kelly Library, Trinity and Wycliffe's John W. Graham Library, and the libraries of Emmanuel College, Regis College, and St. Augustine's Seminary. Students, moreover, have access to the library system of the University of Toronto, including Robarts Library, Canada's largest library and the fourth largest academic library system in North America.

Journals

The Toronto Journal of Theology is published semi-annually. It promotes progressive publication of current opinion on the full range of scholarship represented by diverse Christian traditions through the analysis of issues in Biblical Studies, History of Christianity, Systematic and Pastoral Theology, and Christian Ethics and engagement of cross-cultural perspectives in discussing theological issues.

See also
Association of Theological Schools in the United States and Canada
Higher education in Ontario

References

External links
Toronto School of Theology

Seminaries and theological colleges in Canada
University of Toronto